Qamqam (also, Qam-qam, Gamgam, and Gam-Gam) is a village and municipality in the Quba Rayon of Azerbaijan.  It has a population of 2,080.  The municipality consists of the villages of Qamqam, Sofikənd, and Hacıağalar.

References

External links

Populated places in Quba District (Azerbaijan)